IAF may refer to:

Air forces
 Indian Air Force
 Indonesian Air Force
 Iraqi Air Force
 Israeli Air Force
 Italian Air Force
 Islamic Republic of Iran Air Force

Other organizations
 Indian Armed Forces, the military forces of the Republic of India
 Industrial Areas Foundation, a national community organizing network
 Inter-American Foundation, an independent agency of the United States government
 International Abolitionist Federation, founded in Liverpool in 1875
 International Accreditation Forum, the world association of Conformity Assessment Accreditation bodies
 International Aikido Federation, a world governing body for the sport of Aikido
 International of Anarchist Federations, founded during an international anarchist conference in Carrara in 1968
 International Apostolic Fellowship, a fellowship of Apostolic ministers
 International Astronautical Federation, an international space advocacy organisation
 Islamic Action Front, an Islamist political party in Jordan
 Iowa Atheists and Freethinkers, a U.S. non-profit organization
 Iraqi Accord Front, a Sunni Arab-led Iraqi political coalition

Other uses
 Initial approach fix, where the initial approach segment of an instrument approach begins
 Intangible asset finance, the branch of finance that deals with intangible assets
 Integrated Architecture Framework, a recognized architecture method in the Open Group's IT Architecture Certification (ITAC) program
 Integrate-and-fire, a model for describing neurons
 Fraunhofer Institute for Applied Solid State Physics, a German institute operated by the Fraunhofer Society
Illegal armed formation, a class of militia
Interactive Application Facility, an early version of the Oracle Forms software
Jane's IAF: Israeli Air Force, 1998 video game